BPV may refer to:

 Benign paroxysmal positional vertigo
 Bovine papillomavirus
 Basis point value, in finance
 Back Porch Video, one of the first cable music video programs
 Bipolar violation, in telecommunications
 Bernardo Pereira de Vasconcelos, Brazilian 19th-century congressman